Karen Palacios Pérez is a Venezuelan clarinetist who was part of the National System of Orchestras and the National Philharmonic of Venezuela. Palacios had her contract with the Philharmonic Orchestra canceled for having signed in the recall referendum organized by the opposition led National Assembly in 2017 and later detained for denouncing it on her Twitter account. Palacios was released on 16 July 2019.

Career 
Palacios was a student at the Pedagogical Institute of Caracas and developed her career from the age of 11 in the National System of Orchestras and as a member of the National Philharmonic of Venezuela. In 2017, Palacios Pérez signed in favor of the recall referendum organized  by the opposition led National Assembly; she was later notified that her contract with the Philharmonic Orchestra was canceled because her political position was not convenient for the orchestra. Palacios denounced the incident on her Twitter account and it went viral; Later, she participated in the Chúo Torrealba program and was interviewed in El Nacional.The clarinetist started to receive attacks and threats on social networks and during that year's protests her tweets began to be cited, where she expressed anger at the situation and at the abuse of the security forces, being accused of instigating violence.

Detention 
On 1 June 2019, Palacios was detained by officials from the Directorate General of Military Counterintelligence (DGCIM) at her residence in Carrizal, Miranda state. According to her relatives, the officials posed as teachers of the orchestra and told her that they would take her to the Victim Attention Center, located in the Miraflores presidential palace, and she was accompanied by her mother. Once in the vehicle, she was informed that she would be detained at the DGCIM headquarters in Boleíta, "for inquiries." Palacios was charged with the crime of instigation to hatred and was detained in the National Institute for Female Orientation (INOF), in Los Teques, Miranda state, and confined to a highly dangerous cell, despite having a release order dated from 18 June. In court, her mother was asked not to make her daughter's case public because "it was going to be resolved soon." A month later, the defense of the clarinetist was assumed by the pro bono NGO Foro Penal.

Palacios was released on 16 July 2019.

See also 
 Inés González Árraga
 Cassandra case
 Braulio Jatar

References 

Venezuelan musicians
Clarinetists
Venezuelan torture victims
Venezuelan prisoners and detainees
Year of birth missing (living people)
Living people